Felons and Revolutionaries is the debut studio album by the American nu metal band Dope. The album was released in 1999 on Epic Records and has sold over 236,000 copies in the United States, making it their best-selling album to date. It was re-released on June 17, 2000, with the single "You Spin Me Round (Like a Record)" (Dead or Alive cover) as a bonus track. "Pig Society", "Everything Sucks", "Sick", and "Debonaire" were also released as singles, but did not chart.

Track listing

The track listing on the back cover of some pressings does not list the song "Fuck tha Police" as appearing on the record. This is most likely due to a typographical error, censorship, or the producers using too much of the space on the back of the album for the artwork. The original pressing for the album's Canadian release does list the song on the back cover. There are also reports that some versions of the album actually did not contain this song.

On the later pressing that included "You Spin Me 'Round (Like a Record)", the song "Everything Sucks" is actually the Andy Wallace remix version.

Appearances in other media
"Debonaire" is used during the SWAT assault scene in the movie The Fast and the Furious.
"Debonaire" was used as the entrance theme of the wrestler Rhino in ECW. It was also used as the opening song for their video game Anarchy Rulz. Also used in the movie Run All Night starring Liam Neeson and Joel Kinnaman.

Personnel
Dope
 Edsel Dope – lead vocals, programming, additional guitars, bass
 Simon Dope – keyboards, percussion, sampling
 Tripp Eisen – lead guitar
 Acey Slade – rhythm guitar, bass, backing vocals
 Sloane Jentry – bass
 Preston Nash – drums

Additional personnel
 DJ Lethal – screaming hummingbird on track 12
 The N.Y.C. Dope Choir – backing vocals on track eight

Production
 Jordan Schur – executive production and A&R
 Edsel Dope – production, arrangements, artwork, design, digital editing, engineering, layout, mixing
 Chip Quigley – management and direction
 John Travis – production, engineering, recording, mixing
 Acey Slade – engineering
 Eric Too – assistant engineering
 Derek Carlson – assistant engineering
 Mr. Big Head – assistant engineering
 Jay Baumgardner – mixing
 Blumpy – mixing
 Will Gibson – A&R coordination for Flip
 Kaz Utsunomiya – A&R for Epic
 Larry Robinson – business affairs
 Joe Serling – legal representation
 Howie Weinberg – mastering
 Roger Lian – editing
 John Ditmar – booking
 Peter Ciccotto – design
 Marina Chavez – photography
 Chapman Baehler – photography
 Mear at Conart – artwork

Chart positions
Album

Single

References

1999 debut albums
Dope (band) albums
Epic Records albums
Speed metal albums